"Byns enda blondin" is a song written by Niklas Strömstedt. Sung from the perspective of a postman, it was recorded by Sven-Ingvars, who released it as a single in 1994., and also appeared as a title track on the album with the same name.

The song became a Svensktoppen hit for 15 weeks between 5 March-11 June 1994.

The song was also recorded by Fagrells in 1995 and Niklas Strömstedt himself in 1998.

References 

1994 songs
1994 singles
Songs written by Niklas Strömstedt
Sven-Ingvars songs
Swedish-language songs